Shin Saw (also known as Asaw) was the chief wife of Prince Naratheinga Uzana of Pagan. Naratheinga is regarded by some historians such as G.H. Luce and Than Tun as a king that ruled Pagan although none of the Burmese chronicles mentions him as king. Some historians such as Htin Aung and Michael Aung-Thwin do not recognize Naratheinga as king.

Her husband apparently had died on 19 July 1235 when her brother-in-law Kyaswa became king. She was still alive on 24 April 1241 according to a surviving stone inscription at a temple she donated.

Notes

References

Bibliography
 
 
 
 

Chief queens consort of Pagan
12th-century Burmese women
13th-century Burmese women